Trikuta is a three-peaked mountain near Jammu city in Jammu and Kashmir, India which is considered significant and holy in Hinduism.

Significance to history and Hinduism
Trikuta is one of the twenty mountains surrounding Maha Meru (Mount Meru) the home of Brahma. The height is said in the Bhagavata Purana to be 10,000 yojanas, and the three peaks are iron, silver and gold. The mountain is believed to be the second home of the divine goddess Durga. She was created with the power of the three goddesses to end evil; hence, the mountain is called Trikuta.

Trikuta in Jammu
Another Trikuta is located in Jammu,INDIA division. Trikuta, the triple peak, is where the holy shrine of Vaishno Devi can be found.

References

Locations in Hindu mythology
Ancient Indian mountains
Places in the Ramayana
Katra, Jammu and Kashmir